NewcastleGateshead is a brand-name associated with the joint promotion of culture, business and tourism within the conurbation formed by Newcastle upon Tyne and Gateshead.  With the use of printed matter and a web-site, the organisation produces, assembles activities and information into effective communication for local and regional visitors. The group organises various music and art related events to attract tourism to the region. In 2006, NewcastleGateshead was voted  as the arts capital of the UK in a survey conducted by the Artsworld TV channel, 
It failed in its bid for the status of 2008 European Capital of Culture, when the honour went to Liverpool.

References

External links
 NewcastleGateshead.com — NewcastleGateshead official site
 Bridging NewcastleGateshead — NewcastleGateshead housing renewal project

Newcastle upon Tyne
Gateshead